Well cementing is the process of introducing cement to the annular space between the well-bore and casing or to the annular space between two successive casing strings. Personnel who conduct this job are called "Cementers".

Cementing Principle
 To support the vertical and radial loads applied to the casing
 Isolate porous formations from the producing zone formations
 Exclude unwanted sub-surface fluids from the producing interval
 Protect casing from corrosion
 Resist chemical deterioration of cement
 Confine abnormal pore pressure
 To increase the possibility to hit the target

Cement is introduced into the well by means of a cementing head. It helps in pumping cement between the running of the top and bottom plugs.

The most important function of cementing is to achieve zonal isolation. Another purpose of cementing is to achieve a good cement-to-pipe bond. Too low an effective confining pressure may cause the cement to become ductile.

For cement, one thing to note is that there is no correlation between the shear and compressive strength. Another fact to note is that cement strength ranges between 1000 and 1800 psi, and for reservoir pressures > 1000 psi; this means that the pipe cement bond will fail first. This would lead to the development of micro-annuli along the pipe.

Cement Classes

A. 0–6000 ft used when special properties are not required.

B. 0–6000 ft used when conditions require moderate to high sulfate resistance

C. 0–6000 ft used when conditions require high early strength

D. 6000–10000 ft used under moderately high temperatures and pressures

E. 10000–14000 ft used under conditions of high temperatures and pressures

F. 10000–16000 ft used under conditions of extremely high temperatures and pressures

G. 0–8000 ft can be used with accelerators and retarders to cover a wide range of well depths and temperatures.
 
H. 0–8000 ft can be used with accelerators and retarders to cover a wide range of well depths and temperatures.
 
J. 12000–16000 ft can be used under conditions of extremely high temperatures and pressures or can be mixed with accelerators and retarders to cover a range of well depth and temperatures.

API cement grades A, B and C correspond to ASTM type I, II and III.

Cement parameters
Particle size distribution.
Distribution of silicate and aluminate phases.
Reactivity of hydrating phases.
Gypsum/hemihydrates ratio and total sulphate content.
Free alkali content.
Chemical nature quantity and specific surface are of initial hydration products.

Given the multitude of cement parameters the best and most thorough and practical method of designing a cement blend is through laboratory testing.

The tests should be conducted on a sample that represents the cement to be used on the job site.

Additives and mechanism of action
There are 8 general categories of additives.

Accelerators reduce setting time and increases the rate of compressive strength build up.
Retarders extend the setting time.
Extenders lower the density
Weighting Agents increase density.
Dispersants reduce viscosity.
Fluid loss control agents.
Lost circulation control agents.
Specialty agents.

Accelerators 
Can be added to shorten the setting time or to accelerate the hardening process.

Calcium chloride, under the right conditions, tends to improve the compressive strength and significantly reduces the thickening and setting time. Used in concentrations of up to 4.0%. The mechanism of this process is debated, but there are four major theories put forward.

It affects the hydration phase by one of the following theories:
Chlorine ions enhance the formation of ettingite (crystalline) Tenoutasse 1978.
Increases the hydration of Aluminate phase/gypsum system. Traettenber & Gratten Bellow 1975.
Accelerates the hydration n of C3S. Stein 1961
Changes the C-S-H structure.
Controls the diffusion of water and ionic species.
C-S-H gel has a higher area and will react faster.
Diffusion of the chloride ions;
Cl− ions diffuse into the C-S-H gel faster, this process producing the precipitation of portlandite sooner.
The smaller size of the Cl− ions causes a greater tendency to diffuse into the C-S-H membrane. Eventually the C-S-H membrane bursts and the hydration process is accelerated.
Changes the aqueous phase composition.

Calcium chloride also produces a high amount of heat during hydration. This heat could accelerate the hydration process.

This heat causes the casing to expand and contract as it dissipates. The differing rates of expansion and contraction could result in the casing pulling away from the cement and lead to the formation of micro-annuli. It also has the ability to affect the cement rheology, the compressive strength development, produce shrinkage by 10–15%, increases the permeability with time, and lowers the sulphate resistance.

Retarders 
They work by one of 4 main theories;

Adsorption theory: the retarder is adsorbed & inhibits water content.
Precipitation theory: reacts with aqueous phase to form an impermeable and insoluble layer around the cement grains.
Nucleation theory: retarder poisons the hydration product and prevents future growth.
Complexation theory: Ca+ ions are chelated by the retarder. A nucleus can't be properly formed.

Lignosulphonates: Wood pulp derived polymers. Effective in all Portland cements and added in concentrations of 0.1% to 1.5% BWOC. It absorbs into the C-S-H gel and causes a change of morphology to a more impermeable structure.

Hydroxycarboxylic Acids – They have hydroxyl carboxyl groups in their molecular structure. Below 93 °C they can cause over-retardation. They are efficient to a temperature of 150 °C. One acid used in citric acid with an effective concentration of 0.1% to 0.3% BWOC.

Saccharide Compounds: sugars are excellent retarders of Portland cement. Such compounds are not commonly used due to the degree of retardation being very sensitive to variation of concentration. It also depends on the compound's susceptibility to alkaline hydrolysis.

Cellulose Derivatives: Polysaccharides derived from wood or vegetable matter, and are stable to the alkali conditions of the cement slurry.

Organophosphates: Alkylene phosphonic acids.

Inorganic Compounds: 
Acids and accompanying salts
Sodium chloride, used in concentrations of up to 5.0% and with bottom hole temperatures less than 160 deg F. It will improve compressive strength and reduce thickening and setting time.
Oxides of zinc and lead.

Extenders 
Reduce slurry density – reduces hydrostatic pressure during cementing. 
Increases slurry yield – reduces the amount of cement required to produce a given volume.

Water extenders – Allow/facilitate the addition of water to help extend the cement blend/slurry.

Low-density aggregates – Materials with densities less than Portland cement (3.15 g/cm3)

Hollow Glass Microspheres - engineered high strength (unicellular) low density (average true densities as low as 0.3 g/cc for the medium strength versions), non porous hollow glass spheres, usually below 40 μm in average particle size, enable hydraulic cement slurries as low as 8 PpG (960 Kg/m^3) 

Gaseous extenders – Nitrogen or air can be used to prepare foam.

Clays – Hydrous aluminum silicates. Most common is bentonite (85% mineral clay smectite). Can be used to obtain a cement of density 11.5 to 15.0 ppg, with concentrations up to 20%. Used with an API ratio of 5.3% water to 1.0% bentonite.
   
Bentonite – this is added in conjunction with additional water, used for specific weight control but makes poor cement.

Pozzolan – finely ground pumice of fly ash. Pozzolan costs very little, but does not achieve much weight reduction of the slurry.

Diatomaceous earth – also requires additional water to be added. Properties are similar to those of bentonite.

Silica – α quartz and condensed silica fume. α quartz is used to prevent strength retrogression in thermal wells. Silica fume (micro fume) is highly reactive, and is regarded as the most effective pozzolanic material available. The high surface area increases the water demand to get pumpable slurry. Such a mixture can produce a cement slurry as low as 11.0 ppg.

Normal concentration = 15% BWOC but can be as high as 28% BWOC. Can sometimes be used to prevent annular fluid migration.

Expanded Perlite—Used to reduce the weight as water is added with its addition. Without bentonite the perlite separates and floats to the upper part of the slurry. Can be used to achieve a slurry weight as low as 12.0ppg. Bentonite in concentrations of 2–4% is also added to prevent segregation of particles and slurry.

Gilsonite – Used to obtain slurry weights as low as 12.0ppg. In high concentrations, mixing is a problem.

Powdered coal – Can be used to obtain a slurry with a density as low as 11.9ppg, 12.5–25 lbs per sack are usually added.

Particulate materials 
Uses latex additives to achieve fluid loss. Emulsion polymers are supplied as suspensions of polymer particles. They contain about 50% solids. Such particles can physically plug the pores in the filter cake.

Water-soluble polymers 
They increase the viscosity of the aqueous phase and decrease the filter cake permeability.

Cellulose derivatives 
Organic proteins (polypeptides). Not used above temperatures of 93 °C.

Non-ionic synthetic polymers Can lower fluid loss rates from 500 ml/30 min to 20 ml/30 min.

There are also anionic synthetic polymers and cationic polymers.

Bridging agents 
The addition of materials that can physically bridge fractured or weak zones. E.g. gilsonite and cellophane flakes added in quantities of 0.125–0.500 lbs/sack.

Thixotropic Cement 
These are cement slurries that upon entering the formation begin to gel and eventually become self-supporting.

References

Marca, C. (1990). Remedial Cementing. Sugar Land, Texas: Schlumberger Educational Services.
Nelson, E. B. (1990). Well Cementing. (E. B. Nelson, Ed.) Sugar Land Texas 77478: Schlumberger Educational Services.
Rae, P. (1990). Cement Job Design. Sugar Land, Texas: Schulumberger Educational Services.

External links
How Does Cementing Work?
Cementing Operations: An Integrated Approach

Oil wells